Hansima Karunaratne (born 4 October 1993) is a Sri Lankan cricketer who plays for Sri Lanka's women's cricket team. She made her One Day International (ODI) debut against India on 19 February 2016. In January 2020, she was named in Sri Lanka's squad for the 2020 ICC Women's T20 World Cup in Australia.

References

External links
 

1993 births
Living people
Sri Lankan women cricketers
Sri Lanka women One Day International cricketers
Sri Lanka women Twenty20 International cricketers